Rat Cage is an independent record label the Beastie Boys worked with until they switched to Def Jam in 1984. Most notably, the Beastie Boys' debut EP Polly Wog Stew was released on the label.

Rat Cage discography:
 CT-001        Crucial T. - Darkened Days (7", EP)
 MOTR 21 	Beastie Boys - Polly Wog Stew EP (7")
 MOTR 21C 	Beastie Boys - Polly Wog Stew EP (Cass)
 MOTR 21CD 	Beastie Boys - Polly Wog Stew EP (CD)
 MOTR 21T 	Beastie Boys - Polly Wog Stew EP (12")
 MOTR 24       The Young And The Useless - Real Men Don't Floss (7", EP)
 MOTR 25 	Neos - Hassibah Gets The Martian Brain Squeeze (7", EP)
 MOTR 26 	Beastie Boys - Cooky Puss (12", EP)
 MOTR 26 CD 	Beastie Boys - Cooky Puss (CD, Maxi)
 MOTR 27       Heart Attack - Subliminal Seduction (12", EP)
 MOTR 28 	Rattus - Rattus (LP, Album)
 MOTR 29 	Agnostic Front - Victim In Pain (LP, Album)
 MOTR 29C 	Agnostic Front - Victim In Pain (Cass)
 MOTR 31       Virus - Dark Ages (12", EP)

References

See also
 List of record labels

American record labels
Punk record labels
Beastie Boys